{{safesubst:#invoke:RfD|||month = March
|day = 15
|year = 2023
|time = 18:32
|timestamp = 20230315183212

|content=
REDIRECT Queensboro Bridge

}}